Xochitl Gomez (born April 29, 2006) is an American actress. She is known for playing America Chavez in the Marvel Cinematic Universe film Doctor Strange in the Multiverse of Madness (2022). She has also played Dawn Schafer in the first season of the Netflix series The Baby-Sitters Club (2020).

Early life
Gomez was born in Los Angeles, California, to parents of Mexican descent.

Career
Gomez began acting at age five in local musicals. Before appearing in The Baby-Sitters Club, Gomez had roles in the television series Gentefied, Raven's Home, and You're the Worst. In 2020, Gomez won a Young Artist Award for Supporting Teen Artist for her work in the 2019 film, Shadow Wolves. In October that year, it was announced that Gomez, 14 years old at that point, would play America Chavez in Doctor Strange in the Multiverse of Madness. In March 2021, Netflix recast the role of Dawn Schafer in season 2 of The Baby-Sitters Club due to scheduling conflicts with Gomez filming Doctor Strange in the Multiverse of Madness.

Personal life
Gomez marched in support of the Black Lives Matter movement and at the 2017 Women's March.

Filmography

Film

Television

Awards and nominations

References

External links

Xochitl Gomez

Living people
21st-century American actresses
Actresses from Los Angeles
American actresses of Mexican descent
American child actresses
American film actresses
American television actresses
2006 births